Varming may refer:

Hanne Varming (born 1939), Danish sculptor and medallist.
Steensen Varming, Danish  engineering firm